Mexico–Saint Kitts and Nevis relations are the diplomatic relations between the United Mexican States and Saint Kitts and Nevis. Both nations are members of the Association of Caribbean States, Organization of American States and the United Nations.

History
Mexico and Saint Kitts and Nevis established diplomatic relations on 31 July 1990. Since the establishment of diplomatic relations, relations between both nations have taken place primarily in multilateral forums. In 1999, both nations signed an Agreement for Scientific and Technical Cooperation. In February 2010, Kittitian Prime Minister Denzil Douglas paid a visit to Cancún to attend the Mexico-Caribbean Community (CARICOM) summit.

In 2013, as a favor to Prime Minister Denzil Douglas, Mexico financed and supervised the construction of two police stations in the towns of Dieppe Bay Town and Tabernacle with a total cost of US$1.3 million. The project concluded in 2014. In May 2014, Kittitian Prime Minister Denzil Douglas traveled to Mexico to attend the Mexico-Caribbean Community summit in Mérida. In May 2015, Mexico opened an honorary consulate in Basseterre.

In June 2017, Kittitian Foreign Minister Mark Brantley paid a visit to Mexico to attend the 47th General Assembly of the Organization of American States in Cancún. Each year, the Mexican government offers scholarships for nationals of Saint Kitts and Nevis to study postgraduate studies at Mexican higher education institutions.

High-level visits
High-level visits from Saint Kitts and Nevis to Mexico
 Prime Minister Denzil Douglas (2010, 2014)
 Foreign Minister Mark Brantley (2017)

Trade
In 2018, trade between Mexico and Saint Kitts and Nevis totaled US$2.2 million. Mexico's main exports to Saint Kitts and Nevis include: ocean liners; excursion boats; organic surface agents; refrigerators, freezers and other equipment. Saint Kitts and Nevis's main exports to Mexico include: equipment for recording or reproduction of sound, images and television sound devices; electrical surge protectors; and integrated electronic circuits. Mexican multinational company, Cemex operates in Saint Kitts and Nevis.

Diplomatic missions
 Mexico is accredited to Saint Kitts and Nevis from its embassy in Castries, Saint Lucia and maintains an honorary consulate in Basseterre.
 Saint Kitts and Nevis is accredited to Mexico from its embassy in Washington, D.C., United States.

References 

Saint Kitts and Nevis
Mexico